Thelasis, commonly known as fly orchids, is a genus of flowering plants from the orchid family, Orchidaceae. Plants in this genus are usually epiphytes, sometimes lithophytes or rarely terrestrials. Some species have pseudobulbs with up to three leaves, whilst others have several leaves in two ranks. A large number of small, white or greenish yellow flowers are borne on a thin, arching flowering stem. There are about thirty species, distributed from tropical and subtropical Asia to the southwest Pacific.

Description
Plants in the genus Thelasis are mostly epiphytic or lithophytic, rarely terrestrial sympodial herbs with thin roots. They often have small pseudobulbs with up to three leaves but sometimes have flattened stems with several leaves in two ranks. Many small white or greenish yellow flowers are crowded on a thin arching flowering stem. The flowers are resupinate, tube-shaped near the base with sepals and petals free from and similar to each other although with the petals usually shorter and narrower. The labellum is stiffly attached to the base of the column and lacks lobes.

Taxonomy and naming
The genus Thelasis was first formally described in 1825 by Carl Ludwig Blume who published the description in Bijdragen tot de flora van Nederlandsch Indië . The name Thelasis is derived from the Ancient Greek word thelazo meaning "suckle" or "nurse", possibly referring to a small nipple-like structure on the column.

Species list
The following is a list of species of Thelasis accepted by the World Checklist of Selected Plant Families as at January 2019:

 Thelasis abbreviata (Schltr.) W.Kittr. - New Guinea
 Thelasis angustifolia J.J.Sm. - New Guinea
 Thelasis bifolia Hook.f. - Assam
 Thelasis borneensis Schltr. - Borneo
 Thelasis capitata Blume - conical fly orchid, Christmas Island, Thailand, Malaysia, Indonesia, Philippines 
 Thelasis carinata Blume - triangular fly orchid, Queensland, Thailand, Malaysia, Indonesia, Philippines, New Guinea, Solomon Islands, Samoa 
 Thelasis carnosa Ames & C.Schweinf. in O.Ames - Sabah
 Thelasis cebolleta J.J.Sm. - Borneo
 Thelasis celebica Schltr. - Sulawesi
 Thelasis compacta Schltr. - New Guinea
 Thelasis copelandii Kraenzl. in H.G.A.Engler  - New Guinea
 Thelasis cycloglossa Schltr. - New Guinea
 Thelasis edelfeldtii Kraenzl. in H.G.A.Engler  - New Guinea
 Thelasis gautierensis J.J.Sm. - New Guinea
 Thelasis globiceps J.J.Sm. - New Guinea
 Thelasis javanica J.J.Sm. - Java
 Thelasis khasiana Hook.f. - Yunnan, Assam, Thailand, Vietnam
 Thelasis longifolia Hook.f. - Nepal, India, Sikkim, Bhutan, Assam
 Thelasis macrobulbon Ridl - Malaysia, Borneo
 Thelasis mamberamensis J.J.Sm.  - New Guinea
 Thelasis micrantha (Brongn.) J.J.Sm. - Myanmar, Thailand, Vietnam, Malaysia, Indonesia, Philippines, New Guinea 
 Thelasis obtusa Blume - Bali, Java, Borneo, Sumatra, Philippines 
 Thelasis perpusilla (C.S.P.Parish & Rchb.f.) Schuit. – Indochina
 Thelasis pygmaea (Griff.) Lindl. - Hainan, Hong Kong, Taiwan, Yunnan Nepal, Sikkim, Assam, Bhutan, Andaman & Nicobar Islands, Indochina, Malaysia, Indonesia, New Guinea, Bismarck Islands, Solomon Islands 
 Thelasis rhomboglossa (Schltr.) Kraenzl. in H.G.A.Engler - Sumatra
 Thelasis succosa Carr - Malaysia
 Thelasis variabilis Ames & C.Schweinf. in O.Ames - Sabah, Sarawak
 Thelasis wariana (Schltr.) Schuit. & de Vogel - New Guinea

Distribution
Orchids in the genus Thelasis are found in China, Taiwan, the Indian Subcontinent, the Andaman Islands, Cambodia, Laos, Myanmar, the Nicobar Islands, Thailand, Vietnam, Borneo, Java, the Lesser Sunda Islands, Peninsular Malaysia, the Maluku Islands, the Philippines, Sulawesi, Sumatra, Christmas Island, the Bismarck Archipelago, New Guinea, the Solomon Islands, Queensland (Australia) and Samoa.

See also
 List of Orchidaceae genera

References

 
Podochileae genera